Kentucky Route 236 is a state highway in Boone and Kenton Counties in Northern Kentucky. The southern terminus is at KY 1303 in Edgewood. The northern terminus is at the Cincinnati/Northern Kentucky International Airport near Hebron, where it meets KY 212.

Route description
KY 236 begins at an intersection with KY 1303 (Turkeyfoot Road) in Edgewood, near the border of Erlanger. The route heads northwest into Erlanger as Stevenson Road, passing through a mixed commercial and residential district. After crossing railroad tracks, the route meets U.S. Routes 25, 42, and 127 (Dixie Highway) in a commercial area. From here, KY 236 continues northeast as Commonwealth Avenue through Erlanger until it meets Interstates 71 and 75 at Exit 184A. Past this junction, the route enters unincorporated Boone County and becomes Donaldson Highway. It continues northeast until it reaches the east side of Cincinnati/Northern Kentucky International Airport, where it turns north along the side of the airport. KY 236 turns west at the northeast corner of the airport before terminating at KY 212.

Major intersections

References

0236
Transportation in Kenton County, Kentucky
Transportation in Boone County, Kentucky